Marcin Szałęga (born August 12, 1982 in Żary) is a former Polish footballer.

External links 
 

1982 births
Living people
Polish footballers
Lechia Gdańsk players
Wisła Kraków players
Górnik Zabrze players
Górnik Polkowice players
Bruk-Bet Termalica Nieciecza players
People from Żary
Sportspeople from Lubusz Voivodeship
Association football midfielders